Grafton Group plc is a builders merchants business based in the United Kingdom and Ireland. It is listed on the London Stock Exchange, and is a constituent of the FTSE 250 Index.

History
The company was established by William Chadwick as Chadwicks (Dublin) Ltd in 1902. It subsequently became Concrete Products of Ireland. It was the subject of an initial public offering in 1965 and building materials company Marley subsequently took a 51% stake. Michael Chadwick bought out Marley and renamed the business Grafton Group in 1987.

In March 1998, it bought British Dredging, a United Kingdom builders merchants. In February 2003, it bought Jackson Building Centres, another British builders merchants, based in Lincolnshire.

In October 2003, it also bought Plumbline, Scotland's largest independent plumbers merchants. In June 2004, it bought Heiton Group, Ireland’s largest independent plumbers merchants. In December 2006, it then bought Plumbworld, one of the United Kingdom’s largest online bathroom retailers.

In August 2013, it bought Wearside builders' merchant Thompsons, in October 2013, it bought Binje Ackermans, a Brussels based merchanting operation, and in December 2013, Grafton Group opened ten showrooms, and launched a brand new website called Bohen, which focuses on the bathroom, kitchen and bedroom industry.

Then in September 2014, it bought Direct Builders Merchants, a general merchanting business based in Kent and in December 2014, it bought Crescent Building Supplies, a builders' merchant based in Ruislip. In March 2015, it bought TG Lynes, a distributor of mechanical engineering products, in January 2016, it bought T Brewer, a timber distributor based in London, and in March 2016, it bought Allsand Supplies, a general builders' merchant located in Kent.

In January 2022 the company announced the completion of the sale of its merchanting business in the UK to Huws Gray for £520m. Businesses sold include Buildbase, Civils & Lintels, PDM Buildbase, The Timber Group, Bathroom Distribution Group, Frontline and NDI Brands.

Operations
The company owns the Buildbase, Woodie's DIY, Civils and Lintels, Selco and Jacksons brands. It also has a number of businesses that trade exclusively online.

References

External links
Official site

Companies formerly listed on Euronext Dublin
Business services companies established in 1902
Companies listed on the London Stock Exchange
1902 establishments in Ireland